Xenograpsus is a genus of crustaceans belonging to the monotypic family Xenograpsidae.

The species of this genus are found in Southeastern Asia and New Zealand.

Species:

Xenograpsus ngatama 
Xenograpsus novaeinsularis 
Xenograpsus testudinatus

References

Decapods
Decapod genera